David Jenkins is an American television writer, producer, and showrunner. He created the sitcoms Our Flag Means Death for HBO Max and People of Earth for TBS.

Life and career
Jenkins was born in Minneapolis and grew up in the suburbs of Chicago. He attended Lake Forest High School in Lake Forest, IL. He went to Boston University for his undergraduate studies and received a degree in philosophy and political science. He received an MFA in Acting from NYU where he was awarded the Paul Walker Scholarship. While working as an actor in New York, Chicago, and at revered institutions such as Yale Rep and San Francisco's ACT, Jenkins began writing plays. He was a founding member of a theater company called "Human Animals" through which he could produce his own work. "Human Animals is a theater company dedicated to the exploration of the idiosyncrasies of the Human Animal," explained a press release. Later on, Jenkins explained that the company was a way for him to get off the ground as a new writer, "It was a way to produce. I'm the only playwright. We would produce my work, and then self-produce some with some friends. I kind of feel like no one's going to do your work when you're starting to do this because no one really knows what you're doing. Especially if you're doing something kind of different!"

Plays
Jenkins' plays include middlemen, Post Office, Laissez-Faire, and Small Claims. Post Office was named one of the top 10 off-Broadway shows of 2011 by Paper magazine. His first play, middlemen, received international acclaim and has been produced in Chile and Norway after debuting with his company, Human Animals, where it was directed by his future wife, Josie. His works were typically slice-of-life, workplace driven comedy confronting relevant societal themes.

Jenkins worked with Page 73 for several years – in the Interstate 73 Writers Group in 2013 and as a Summer Resident in 2014. He was also a finalist for their Fellowship in 2013 and 2014.

Television
Jenkins created and wrote TBS science fiction comedy series People of Earth, which ran for 2 seasons from 2016-17. He wrote the pilot for People of Earth (originally titled The Group) with Wyatt Cenac in mind.

In 2020, HBO Max greenlit a Jenkins' queer pirate workplace rom-com, Our Flag Means Death. Jenkins served as creator, showrunner, writer, and even guest actor for the show's first season. He was inspired to create the show after a conversation with his wife led him to the Wikipedia pages of real-life pirates Stede Bonnet and Blackbeard, who were written to have sailed together. "Just the idea of somebody who has a terrible midlife crisis and decides to do this, and then really hurts his family and hurts his wife and hurts his kids, and we don't know why. It's lost to history. And then the world's greatest pirate takes him under his wing, and then they have a whole voyage together, and we don't know why. It's lost to history. So all of his facts are fascinating, and then all of the questions that are unanswered are fascinating," Jenkins explained in an interview.

The show premiered in March 2022 and received instant acclaim. Viewers were drawn to the show's unique charm that subverted the genre and defied people's expectations of Queerbaiting in media by depicting multiple canonically queer couples. They instantly took to social media, generating a large fandom around Jenkins' work. The show continued to gain momentum after release, staying at the top of charts for Most In Demand New Shows for Weeks straight, beating out tough competition from big names like Marvel and Star Wars. On 1 June 2022, HBOMax announced that the show would be renewed for a second season. In September 2022 the show began filming in Aotearoa (New Zealand), and Jenkins has confirmed that he directed the first episode of season 2 in addition to his existing duties.

References

External links 
 

Living people
American television writers
New York University alumni
People from Minneapolis
Television producers from Minnesota
American television producers
American comedy writers
1981 births